The Belarus women's national under-18 volleyball team represents Belarus in international women's volleyball competitions and friendly matches under the age 18 and it is ruled and managed by the Volleyball Federation Of The Rep. Of Belarus (BVF) That is an affiliate of Federation of International Volleyball FIVB and also a part of European Volleyball Confederation CEV.
In light of the 2022 Russian invasion of Ukraine, the European Volleyball Confederation (CEV) banned all Belarusian national teams, clubs, and officials from participating in European competition, and suspended all members of Belarus from their respective functions in CEV organs.

Results

Summer Youth Olympics
 Champions   Runners up   Third place   Fourth place

FIVB U19 World Championship
 Champions   Runners up   Third place   Fourth place

Europe U18 / U17 Championship
 Champions   Runners up   Third place   Fourth place

Team

Previous squad

The following is the Belarusian roster in the 2019 FIVB Girls' U18 World Championship.

Head coach: Dzmitry Kot

References

External links
Official website

National women's under-18 volleyball teams
Volleyball
Volleyball in Belarus